Samuela H. S. "Semi" Taupeaafe (born in Nuku'alofa, on 29 July 1972）is a Tongan former rugby union player. He played as wing and centre.

Career 
He represented Tonga in rugby union, Australia in rugby sevens, and Japan at the COBRA Rugby Tens, He is one of the rare players to play for three national teams. At the 1995 COBRA Rugby Tens, he led Japan to the final, lost against the Māori All Blacks. 
In 2005, Taupeaafe was part of the Ikale Tahi management team, along with Sione Petelo, Tevita Vaʻenuku and Nafe Tufui.

Club career 
At club level, Taupeaafe played for the NSW Waratahs, then for  Sanyo and later for Tokyo Gas Rugby Club.

International career
At international level, he debuted for Tonga on 11 June 1991, during the test match against Fiji, in Suva. Although not taking part at the 1995 Rugby World Cup, he would be called up later for the 1999 Rugby World Cup Tonga squad. At the tournament, he played 3 matches. His last cap was against Samoa, on 29 June 2001, in Nuku'alofa. He also represented Australia for the 1993 Rugby World Cup Sevens.

References

External links 
Semi Taupeaafe international statistics  at ESPN Scrum
Semi Taupeaafe profile at New Zealand Rugby History

Living people
1972 births
Japan international rugby union players
Tonga international rugby union players
Saitama Wild Knights players
Rugby union wings
Tongan expatriate sportspeople in Australia
Tongan expatriate sportspeople in Japan
Rugby union centres